Frédérick Rolette (September 23, 1785 to March 17, 1831), born in Quebec City on September 23, 1785, was an officer of the Royal Navy who served in the Provincial Marine during the War of 1812.

Biography
Frédérick Rolette (spelled “Frédéric” in his birth records) was born in Quebec City and entered the Royal Navy at a young age. Some secondary accounts have him serving (and being wounded) at the Battle of the Nile in 1799 and also serving at the Battle of Trafalgar in 1805. However, he is not listed among officers wounded at the Nile nor among British participants at Trafalgar. Whatever his role in the Royal Navy, he is said to have returned to Canada and to have taken a commission as a second lieutenant in the Provincial Marine in October 1807.

Just before the outbreak of the War of 1812, Rolette was posted to Amherstburg, Upper Canada, now as first lieutenant in command of the 10-gun brig . When word of the outbreak of war reached Amherstburg in early July 1812, Rolette captured an American vessel, the Cuyahoga Packet, before the crew of that vessel was aware that war had been declared. As reported by Thomas Vercheres de Boucherville, Rolette seized the vessel by leading some two-dozen sailors and Indians in a long boat and canoes who boarded the ship without meeting any resistance. The capture of the ship meant that the papers of William Hull, the general assigned the task of leading the American invasion of Canada across the Detroit River, fell into British hands.

Rolette then served at the subsequent capture of Fort Detroit in August 1812, where the entire American invasion force was compelled to surrender. Of his service, the British commander, Major-General Isaac Brock, is reported to have commented that: “I have watched you during the action ... you behaved like a lion and I will remember you.” Rolette was in command of the brig Detroit in October 1812 when he and his ship (along with the brig Caledonia) were captured by the Americans in a surprise raid in which the defenders were heavily outnumbered. Despite the capture of his ship, Brock again referred to him as a having had "the character of a brave attentive officer". Quickly exchanged as a prisoner, he then commanded a naval gun contingent on land during the Battle of Frenchtown in January 1813, where, although suffering a head wound,  he refused to leave the field. As captain of the General Hunter in 1812–13, he captured more than a dozen prizes.

Rolette served as second-in-command of British schooner Lady Prevost at the Battle of Lake Erie on September 10, 1813. When the captain, Lieutenant James Buchan, was mortally wounded, he assumed command until he himself was severely wounded as the result of an explosion. He was forced to surrender his ship and again became a prisoner of war, this time for the remainder of the conflict.

Rolette returned to Quebec City at the conclusion of the war and was presented a fifty-guinea sword of honour by its citizens. He died on March 17, 1831, never having fully recovered from his many wounds.

Legacy
The Canton of Rolette, Quebec, located on the south shore of the St. Lawrence River, was established in 1868 in his honour.

An Arctic Offshore Patrol Ship of the Royal Canadian Navy, which started construction in May 2021, is named in his honour.

References

Royal Navy personnel of the War of 1812
1785 births
1831 deaths
Provincial Marine
British people of the War of 1812
British military personnel of the War of 1812
Canadian people of the War of 1812